Drumheller  is a town on the Red Deer River in the badlands of east-central Alberta, Canada.

Drumheller was named after Samuel Drumheller, who, after purchasing the homestead of Thomas Patrick Greentree, had it surveyed into the original Drumheller townsite and put lots on the market in 1911. Also in 1911, Samuel Drumheller started coal mining operations near the townsite.

Drumheller got a railway station in 1912. It was then incorporated as a village on May 15, 1913, a town on March 2, 1916, and a city on April 3, 1930. Over a 15-year period, Drumheller's population increased  from 312 in 1916 to 2,987 in 1931 shortly after becoming a city.

Drumheller boomed until the end of the Second World War when coal lost most of its value.

The City of Drumheller amalgamated with the Municipal District of Badlands No. 7 on January 1, 1998, to form the current Town of Drumheller. Some of the reasons the two municipalities amalgamated included Badlands No. 7 having more in common with Drumheller than other surrounding rural municipalities and both were experiencing similar planning and development issues due to their locations within the Red Deer River valley. The amalgamated municipality opted for town status rather than city status so that highways within would remain the responsibility of the Province of Alberta.

The 1998 amalgamation resulted in Drumheller absorbing six hamlets that were previously under the jurisdiction of the Municipal District of Badlands No. 7—Cambria, East Coulee, Lehigh, Nacmine, Rosedale and Wayne. Drumheller also previously absorbed the hamlets of Bankview, Midlandvale (Midland), Newcastle and North Drumheller during annexations while under city status. Bankview and Midland were annexed in 1964 and 1972 respectively, while Newcastle and North Drumheller were both annexed in 1967. Other localities within Drumheller, either absorbed through past annexations or its eventual amalgamation with Badlands No. 7, include Aerial, Eladesor, Kneehill, Rosedale Station, Western Monarch (Atlas) and Willow Creek.

In total, Drumheller has absorbed at least 13 other communities in its history, some of which are now recognized as neighbourhoods or districts within the town.

Geography

Climate 
Drumheller experiences a semi-arid climate (BSk) with very cold winters and hot summers.

Demographics 

In the 2016 Census of Population conducted by Statistics Canada, the Town of Drumheller recorded a population of 7,982 living in 3,164 of its 3,471 total private dwellings, a  change from its 2011 population of 8,029.

Economy 
Drumheller was once the largest coal producing city in Western Canada, with the Atlas Coal Mine. Now, coal mining has been replaced by natural gas and oil. Drumheller has Alberta's second largest natural gas field, the West Drumheller Field. However, Drumheller is planning to transition away from fossil fuels and emphasize renewable energy sources, such as wind power, in its economy.

Currently, tourism is Drumheller's main industry. A federal prison and regional medical complex also contribute to the economy. Agriculture is also quite important.

Attractions 

South of the traffic bridge over the Red Deer river on Highway 9 is the World's Largest Dinosaur, a 26.2-metre (86 ft) high fiberglass Tyrannosaurus rex that can be entered for a view of the Badlands, including the adjacent 23 metre (75 ft) water fountain, again one of the largest in Canada. Tourist attractions also include the Star Mine Suspension Bridge, Atlas Coal Mine, Canadian Badlands Passion Play, Horseshoe Canyon, Rotary Spray Park, Aquaplex (with indoor and outdoor pools), Horse Thief Canyon, hoodoos, Midland Provincial Park, the Rosedeer Hotel in Wayne,  of constructed pathways, Bleriot Ferry, East Coulee School Museum, the Homestead Museum and the Little Church, which is capable of seating only six patrons.

Next to the now closed Drumheller ski hill is the Canadian Badlands Passion Play site, where, for two weeks each July, performances are held. Companies are composed of actors from all over Alberta. The site also offers small plays throughout the summer and an interpretive centre.

Drumheller is also home to the Valley Doll Museum and Gifts, where it displays over 700 dolls.

Royal Tyrrell Museum 

The Royal Tyrrell Museum of Palaeontology is a museum that hosts Canada's largest collection of dinosaur fossils. It boasts 375,000 visitors a year, the largest of all provincial museum attractions. It opened on September 25, 1985. The Royal Tyrrell Museum is located in the northwest quadrant of the Town of Drumheller, in Midland Provincial Park.

Media

Digital 
DrumhellerOnline.com is Drumheller's local news portal.

Radio 
 Boom 99.5: CHOO-FM, Classic hits (Rock)
 FM 94.5: CHTR-FM, tourist information
 AM 910: CKDQ, country music
 FM 91.3: CKUA-FM-13, public broadcasting (relay)

Newspapers 
Newspapers covering Drumheller include the weekly Drumheller Mail, which has been publishing every Wednesday since 1911 and has been owned by the Sheddy family since 1954.

Television 
All stations are analogue relays of stations from Calgary.
 Channel 8: CICT-TV-1 (Global)
 Channel 10: CFCN-TV-6 (CTV) (city grade)
 Channel 12: CFCN-TV-1 (CTV) (from Delia)

Transportation
Drumheller/Ostergard's Airport and Drumheller Municipal Airport are in the vicinity of Drumheller. None have regular passenger flights.

Passenger rail service ran from 1912 up until 1981 but freight continued on the through lines up until 2014.

The railway was decommissioned and demolished in 2014.

Notable people
 Tommy Anderson (1910–1971), professional ice hockey player
 Jaydee Bixby (born 1990), professional musician
 Andrew Bodnarchuk (born 1988), professional ice hockey player
 Don Campbell (1925–2012), professional ice hockey player
 John Murray Campbell ("Jack"; born 1931), Canadian politician
 Philip J. Currie (born 1949), palaeontologist and museum curator
 Bruno De Costa (born 1938), Olympic skeet shooter
 Jack Evans (1928–1996), professional ice hockey player 
 Glen Gorbous (1930-1990), professional baseball player 
 Glenn Gray (1924–2011), curler
 Glenn Hagel (born 1949), provincial and municipal politician
 Doug MacAuley (1929–2009), professional ice hockey player  
 Jackie Pement (born 1946), provincial politician
 Howard E. Ross (1921–2010), land developer and builder
 Frank Sandercock (1887–1942), president of the Canadian Amateur Hockey Association
 Stanley Schumacher (1933-2020), politician and lawyer
 Tom Siddon (born 1941), politician and engineer
 Darren Tanke (born 1960), palaeontologist and museum curator
 Jeff Trembecky (born 1974), professional ice hockey player

See also 
 List of communities in Alberta
 List of towns in Alberta

References

External links 

 

 
1913 establishments in Alberta
Towns in Alberta
Cities in Alberta